Rayah Kitule (born 31 January 1984) is a Tanzanian author and editor of numerous monthly magazines including Fab Sugar, and East African Women and Business Entrepreneurs. She has done numerous writing assignments in Tanzania and abroad.

Biography
Born in Dar es Salaam Tanzania, Rayah Kitule was reared by her single mother in Mikocheni, where she "began her broadcasting and writing career" by learning to read aloud and perform recitations at the age of ten.

She also runs her own fashion blogspot, and started her own production company, called Purple Effect.

External links
 stillinfashion.blogspot.com
 tanzano.blogspot.com

Tanzanian journalists
Living people
1984 births
Tanzanian women writers
Tanzanian women journalists